Prasophyllum subbisectum, commonly known as the Pomonal leek orchid, is a species of orchid endemic to Victoria. It has a single, thin tubular leaf and up to fifteen small, greenish-brown to brown flowers well-spaced along a thin flowering stem. It is only known from a small area around Stawell.

Description
The flowers are greenish-brown to brown and as with others in the genus, are inverted so that the labellum is above the column rather than below it. There is a shiny green or brown, deeply channelled callus along the centre of the labellum, extending almost to its tip. Flowering occurs in October and November.

Taxonomy and naming
Prasophyllum subbisectum was first formally described in 1936 by William Henry Nicholls and the description was published in The Victorian Naturalist from a specimen collected near Pomonal. The specific epithet (subbisectum) is derived from the Latin word sectus meaning "cut", with the prefixes sub- meaning "somewhat" and bi- meaning "two" or "double".

Distribution and habitat
The Pomonal leek orchid mostly grows in heathy woodland near Stawell.

Conservation
In 2010, P. subbisectum was recorded in four populations with a total of about 130 plants. It is listed as "Endangered" under the Commonwealth Government Environment Protection and Biodiversity Conservation Act 1999 (EPBC) Act and the Victorian Flora and Fauna Guarantee Act 1988. The main threats to its survival are grazing by rabbits and kangaroos, habitat disturbance and inappropriate fire regimes.

References

External links 
 

subbisectum
Flora of Victoria (Australia)
Endemic orchids of Australia
Plants described in 1936